Kelvin David George Nagle AM (21 December 1920 – 29 January 2015) was an Australian professional golfer best known for winning The Open Championship in 1960. He won at least one tournament each year from 1949 to 1975.

Biography
Nagle was born in North Sydney. Because of five-and-a-half years of World War II military service (1939–45), Nagle got a late start on pro golf, as he played no golf between ages 19 and 24, and turned pro at age 25 (1946). He made up for lost time by winning at least one tournament each year from 1949 to 1975. During his early career, he had a long swing and was regarded as the longest hitter on the Australasia tour, as evidenced by the Australian press dubbing him as "the Pymble Crusher". By age 39 (in 1960, when he won The Open Championship), Nagle had shortened his swing and become a straight hitter with what Gary Player described as "the best short game out here".

Although he had won over 30 tournaments in Australia, and had won the Canada Cup for Australia in partnership with five-time Open champion Peter Thomson in 1954 and 1959, Nagle was a shock winner of The Open, as he was 39 years old but had never finished in the top-10 at a major championship before. Thomson told Nagle a few weeks prior to the 1960 Open championship that he "had the game" to win and that "you can beat me". He beat the rising star of American golf Arnold Palmer into second place, and it was Palmer who deprived him of his title in 1961. Although he never regained The Open title, Kel Nagle had six top-five finishes at the Open between 1960 and 1966 (ages 39 to 45). His best result in a United States major was second in the 1965 U.S. Open—the year after he won the Canadian Open—when he and Gary Player finished the 72-hole tournament in a tie. Nagle lost to Player the next day in an 18-hole playoff, during which Nagle hit a female spectator in the forehead on the fifth hole and was visibly affected to the point that he hit another spectator on the same hole. Player won the playoff by 3 strokes.

As late as 1970, the year he turned 50, Nagle was ranked among the top ten players in the world on the McCormack's World Golf Rankings, the forerunner of the modern world ranking system. Nagle played on the Senior PGA Tour (now PGA Tour Champions) in the U.S. in the 1980s, when he was in his 60s and early 70s. His best finishes were a pair of T-3s: at the 1981 Eureka Federal Savings Classic and the 1982 Peter Jackson Champions. In July 2007, Nagle was elected to the World Golf Hall of Fame, and was inducted in November 2007.

Nagle died in Sydney on 29 January 2015 at the age of 94.

Recognition
1980 – Member of the Order of Australia for the service to the sport of golf.
1986 – Sport Australia Hall of Fame inductee.
2001 – Australian Sports Medal
2005 – Kel Nagle Plate, presented annually to the best performing rookie in the Australian PGA Championship.
2007 – World Golf Hall of Fame inductee.

Professional wins (94)

PGA Tour wins (2)

PGA Tour playoff record (0–1)

PGA Tour of Australasia wins (7)

Other Australia and New Zealand wins (69)
1949 (1) Australian PGA Championship
1950 (1) WA Open
1951 (4) North Coast Open, New South Wales Close, WA Open, ACT Open
1952 (3) North Coast Open, WA Open, NSW PGA Championship
1953 (3) NSW PGA Championship, Adelaide Advertiser Tournament, McWilliam's Wines Tournament
1954 (5) Australian PGA Championship, North Coast Open, Lakes Open, ACT Open, Riverside and Tasmanian Tyre Services £500 Tournament
1955 (2) North Coast Open, NSW PGA Championship
1956 (1) NSW PGA Championship
1957 (4) New South Wales Close, New Zealand Open, New Zealand PGA Championship, Lakes Open
1958 (5) New Zealand Open, New Zealand PGA Championship, Australian PGA Championship, Lakes Open, Adelaide Advertiser Tournament
1959 (5) Australian Open, Australian PGA Championship, Queensland Open, NSW PGA Championship, Ampol Tournament (tie with Gary Player)
1960 (2) New Zealand PGA Championship, Caltex Tournament
1962 (3) New Zealand Open, Victorian PGA Championship, Adelaide Advertiser Tournament
1963 (2) Lake Karrinyup Bowl, Wiseman's Tournament
1964 (3) New Zealand Open, Queensland Open, Caltex Tournament
1965 (5) Australian PGA Championship, NSW PGA Championship, Forest Products Tournament, BP Tournament (tie with Peter Thomson)
1966 (4) Wills Masters, West End Tournament (tie with Murray Crafter), Caltex Tournament (tie with Peter Thomson), BP Tournament
1967 (3) Victorian Open, New Zealand Open, West End Tournament
1968 (5) New South Wales Open, New Zealand Open, Australian PGA Championship, West End Tournament, BP Tournament
1969 (4) New Zealand Open, Victorian Open, Garden City Classic, Caltex Tournament
1970 (3) New Zealand PGA Championship, NBN-3 Tournament, Otago Charity Classic
1971 (1) NSW PGA Championship
1972 (1) West End Tournament

European wins (11)
1960 Open Championship
1961 French Open, Swiss Open, Irish Hospitals Tournament, Dunlop Tournament
1962 Bowmaker Tournament, Carling-Lancastrian Tournament
1963 Esso Golden Tournament
1965 Bowmaker Tournament
1967 Esso Golden Tournament (tie with Peter Thomson)
1971 Volvo Open

Asian wins (1)
1961 Hong Kong Open

Senior wins (5)
this list may be incomplete
1971 Pringle of Scotland Seniors Championship, World Senior Championship
1973 Pringle of Scotland Seniors Championship
1975 PGA Seniors Championship, World Senior Championship

Major championships

Wins (1)

Results timeline

CUT = missed the half-way cut (3rd round cut in 1974 Open Championship)
"T" = tied

Summary

Most consecutive cuts made – 6 (twice)
Longest streak of top-10s – 2 (1965 U.S. Open – 1965 Open Championship)

Team appearances
Canada Cup (representing Australia): 1954 (winners), 1955, 1958, 1959 (winners), 1960, 1961, 1962, 1965, 1966
Lakes International Cup (representing Australia): 1952, 1954 (winners)
Vicars Shield (representing New South Wales): 1948 (winners), 1949 (winners), 1950 (winners), 1951, 1952, 1953, 1954 (winners), 1955 (winners)

See also
List of men's major championships winning golfers

References

External links

Kel Nagle interviewed by Neil Bennetts, National Library of Australia, 1990

Australian male golfers
PGA Tour of Australasia golfers
European Tour golfers
PGA Tour Champions golfers
Winners of men's major golf championships
World Golf Hall of Fame inductees
Recipients of the Australian Sports Medal
Sport Australia Hall of Fame inductees
Members of the Order of Australia
Golfers from Sydney
1920 births
2015 deaths